Bartonella henselae hypothetical protein 11960 (BH11960) is encoded by the BH11960 gene. This hypothetical protein is conserved in all Bartonella species whose genomes have been sequenced to date, and are highlighted in the picture below.

Bartonella henselae is a gram-negative bacterial pathogen of humans and animals. Like other members of the alphaproteobacteria subdivision, B. henselae is capable of establishing an intracellular lifestyle within eukaryotic cells (3). Infection of immunocompetent humans with B. henselae results in “cat scratch disease,” a regional lymphadenopathy that is typically associated with wounds of feline origin (12, 22). In most cases, the lymph node lesions are self-limiting and antibiotic therapy is not indicated (32). However, in 5 to 14% of infected individuals, atypical manifestations can occur, including prolonged fever, malaise, fatigue, myalgia, arthralgia, weight loss, splenomegaly, and Parinaud's oculoglandular syndrome (32). In contrast, infection of immunosuppressed humans can result in a variety of severe and life-threatening disease syndromes, such as bacillary angiomatosis, peliosis hepatis, endocarditis, and bacteremia (22). Even in cases of severe disease, antibiotic therapy is often effective, but relapses can occur (32).

Properties

Function 
The function of the BH11960 protein is not known, but its function is thought to be involved in signal transduction that regulates aerotolerance in conjunction with the other genes within its cluster. Evidence for such function is:
 Presence of a PRKEL signal peptide domain at the N-terminus of the protein on all orthologs
 Presence of MoxR-AAA family protein in the four-gene cluster, which is predicted to serve as a chaperone
 Hypothesis: The signal peptide PRKEL allows for the cleavage of the N-terminal aerotolerance regulator, which is released into the cytoplasm and folded by the interacting chaperone. This cleaved and modified protein serves as a sensor for oxygen concentration changes and may go on to interact with other parts of the cell to induce a response mechanism.

Protein sequence 
The importance of this protein lies in the beginning of the sequence, and is represented in the conceptual translation below. This region contains the aerotolerance motif, the transmembrane hydrophobic segment highlighted in yellow, and a high-conservation region represented in all studied orthologs. Furthermore, a signal peptide protein is present in this region that allows transport of a protein.

Based on sequence analysis performed by PSortB program, this protein is located in the cytoplasmic membrane of this Gram-negative bacterium and contains a double transmembrane domain.

Gene neighborhood 
The four-gene cluster of BH11940, BH11950, BH11960, and BH11970 all produce proteins of unknown function transcribed on the sense strand and encoded by the same promoter. The promoter is ubiquitously conserved in the other Bartonella species and contains a TATA box. BH11960 is the largest of the four proteins.

Bartonella henselae: BH11960. KEGG Database.

Homologs

References

Further reading 
 
Hypothetical protein BH11960 (Bartonella henselaei str. Houston-1

Proteins